Hans-Jürgen Weber (born 15 June 1955) is a former football referee from Germany.
Between 1978 and 1999 he refereed 135 games in the Fußball-Bundesliga and 76 games in the 2nd Bundesliga. From 1991 to 1998 Hans-Jürgen Weber has refereed quite a few European matches, mainly UEFA Cup (7) and Cup Winners' Cup (4) matches.

Weber is a member of the German Football Association's Referee Commission since 2010.

References

External links
 Profile at worldfootball.net

1955 births
Living people
German football referees
German civil servants
UEFA Europa League referees